Club Deportivo Audaz commonly known as CD Audaz, or simply Audaz, was a Salvadoran association football club based in the town of Apastepeque, and briefly (the final two seasons) in the city of San Vicente,  south of Apastepeque.

The club was founded in 1948, played for decades in non-professional league or semi-professional leagues or the third tier Tercera Division de Fútbol Salvadoreño professional league, then in 2014 started a sudden and successful run out of the Tercera through to the top tier Primera División de Fútbol de El Salvador, but the added costs for a small club playing in the higher tiers drove it to bankruptcy, folding in July 2019.

Audaz was known as Los Coyotes, and had a stylized Coyote symbol as its mascot. Reflecting this theme, the club's long-time home stadium was called Estadio La Coyotera.

History

1948 local club to 2014 Tercera Champion
Audaz was founded in 1948, playing their home games at Estadio La Coyotera, a modest seating-capacity venue in the small town of Apastepeque. For most of their history, the club competed in fourth-tier and lower non-professional league and semi-professional leagues.

On 11 February 2001, Audaz' truck carrying the entire team and staff was shot at by gang members, killing coach José Napoleón Gómez.

Audaz had eventually progressed to the third-tier of league play in El Salvador, the tier-three Tercera Division de Fútbol Salvadoreño (Tercera División).

In the 2013–14 Trecera División season, Audaz won the second half title (Apertura 2014), earning its first ever promotion to the Segunda División de El Salvador (Segunda División).

Segunda: 2014 start to 2017 Champion
Audaz entered the Segunda División in the 2014–15 season.

In its third year in the Segunda División, Audaz won the second half Clausura 2017 title, defeating Independiente FC 4–1 in a two-legged final series, which included a 3–0 victory away from home. Audaz immediately faced Independiente FC again, the champions of the first half of the 2016–17 season (Apertura 2016),  in a one-game promotion playoff, winning 1–0 on a goal by Santos Guzmán. The victory earned Audaz promotion to the top-tier Primera División de Fútbol de El Salvador (La Primera), just three years after they last played in the Tercera División.

La Primera: 2017 to 2019 financial struggles
Audaz entered La Primera for the 2017–18 season. The team immediately ran into financial issues, suffering from ticket sales that did not support their more costly operations in La Primera, and in July 2017 they started moving some of their home games away from Estadio La Coyotera, to the larger-capacity Estadio La Union in the nearby city of San Vicente, which had a population five times that of Apastepeque.

Audaz held their position in La Primera, but entered the 2018–19 Primera División de El Salvador with increasing financial difficulty. The team announced that they would abandon Estadio La Coyotera, and would play all their 2018–19 home games at Estadio La Union and Estadio Jiboa. In July 2018, before the season started, Juan Pablo Herrera and the Herrera family sold the team to a new ownership group, led by Roberto Campos. The team continued to lose money, and Campos tried to arrange a sale to the ownership of Independiente FC, which was still competing in the Segunda División, going so far as to change Audaz' colors to those of Independiente mid-season, starting in January 2019.

July 2019 dissolution
Audaz again maintained their position in La Primera, but would not live to see the 2019–20 Primera División de El Salvador season. In July 2019, after the 2018–19 season was over, it was revealed that Campos had not meet his contractual requirements of the purchase from the previous owner's group, having failed to pay the salaries of the players and staff for most of the season; the team was bankrupt, no owner existed, and the sole remaining board member officially sold Audaz' license in La Primera to Independiente FC.

Just five years after winning the Tercera División title in May 2014, the quick but costly rise through Segunda División and into La Primera had ended the 61-year history of Club Deportivo Audaz.

Stadium
The Estadio San Vicentia placed in neighbourhood of San Vicente. With a capacity of 15,000, t was inaugurated in.

Since its establishment in TBD, Audaz stadiums has been:
 Estadio La Coyotera, Apastepeque (TBD- 2017)
 Estadio San Vicentia (2017-) games played in this location during the first primera division season
 Estadio Mauricio Vides de Ilobasco (2018) due to disagreement with the Council of San vicente, They moved home games to the Estadio Ilobasco
 Complejo Deportivo de Tecoluca (2018) games played in this location during the primera division season

Club records in La Primera
 First victory: 1-0 C.D. FAS August 13, 2017
 First goalscorer: Daley Mena v C.D. Pasaquina 5 September 2017
 Top goalscorer: Daley Mena and Santos Guzman 16 goals
 Largest Home victory, Primera División: 4–0 v Chalatenango, 2018
 Largest Away victory, Primera División: 2-1 v Dragon, 2017  2-1 Isidro Metapan
 Largest Home loss, Primera División: 0–3 v Santa Tecla F.C., 2018
 Largest Away loss, Primera División: 0–4 v Limeno, 2017  0-4 v Santa Tecla F.C., 2018
 Lowest home attendance: 63 v Isidro Metapan, 2018
 Youngest player: Orssy Rodríguez (15 years old) v Chalatenango January 2018

Honours

Domestic honours
 Segunda División Salvadorean and predecessors 
 Champions: Clausura 2017
 Promotion Play-off Winners: 2016-2017
 Tercera División Salvadorean and predecessors 
 Champions: Clausura 2014

Managers
  Armando Amaya (1982)
  José Napoleón Gómez (2001)

The last thirteen managers of Audaz:

References

Audaz
Audaz
Audaz
Audaz